Donglin may refer to:

Donglin Academy, academy established in the Northern Song dynasty at present-day Wuxi in China
Donglin movement, ideological and philosophical movement of the late Ming and early Qing dynasties of China
Donglin Temple, Buddhist monastery in Jiujiang, Jiangxi, China
Donglin Temple, Buddhist temple in Jinshan District, Shanghai, China